Acacia sericata is a shrub or tree of the genus Acacia and the subgenus Plurinerves that is endemic across northern Australia.

Description
Like most species of Acacia it has phyllodes rather than true leaves.

Taxonomy
The species was first formally described by the botanist Allan Cunningham in 1842 as part of George Bentham and William Jackson Hooker's work Notes on Mimoseae, with a synopsis of species published in the London Journal of Botany. It was reclassified as Racosperma sericatum by Leslie Pedley in 2003 then transferred back to genus Acacia in 2006.

Distribution
It is native to an area in the Kimberley region of Western Australia where it is commonly situated on plateaux and on rocky slopes composed of quartzite, sandstone or laterite. The range extends from the Isdell River in the west to the Drysdale River area in the north east where it is also found along sandy river banks as a part of in open woodland, open forest and shrubland communities.

See also
List of Acacia species

References

sericata
Acacias of Western Australia
Taxa named by George Bentham
Plants described in 1842
Flora of the Northern Territory
Flora of Queensland
Taxa named by Allan Cunningham (botanist)